Kentenia State Forest is a state forest in Harlan County, Kentucky, United States. It became Kentucky's first state forest in 1919 when the land was donated to the state by the coal company Kentenia-Cantron. The land is scattered across seven tracts on the south side of Pine Mountain.

External links
Official Page

Kentucky state forests
Protected areas established in 1919
Protected areas of Harlan County, Kentucky